The Qualified Lawyers Transfer Test (QLTT) was a regulatory exam for foreign licensed lawyers who wanted to practice as solicitors in England and Wales.  From 2010, the test was gradually phased out in favor of Qualified Lawyers Transfer Scheme.  QLTT required eligibility such as being from certain jurisdictions and years of legal practice. The QLTT is no longer in force.

Format
The test covers four subject areas of "heads". 
 Head 1 – Property
 Head 2 – Litigation (either criminal or civil)
 Head 3 – Professional conduct and accounts
 Head 4 – Principles of common law

Sources

Legal education in the United Kingdom